Pantysgallog High Level Halt railway station was a station that served the village of Pant, Merthyr Tydfil, Wales on the Brecon and Merthyr Tydfil Junction Railway. A short branch line from Pant to Dowlais Central. The station closed in 1960 with the line and the site is now a housing estate.

References 

Disused railway stations in Merthyr Tydfil County Borough
Former Brecon and Merthyr Tydfil Junction Railway stations
Railway stations in Great Britain opened in 1910
Railway stations in Great Britain closed in 1960
1910 establishments in Wales
1960 disestablishments in Wales